Lygisaurus tanneri, also known commonly as the Endeavour River litter-skink and Tanner's four-fingered skink,  is a species of lizard in the family Scincidae. The species is endemic to Australia.

Etymology
The specific name, tanneri, is in honor of Australian herpetologist Charles Tanner (1911–1996).

Geographic range
L. tanneri is found in Queensland, Australia.

Habitat
The preferred natural habitat of L. tanneri is forest.

References

Further reading
Cogger HG (2014). Reptiles and Amphibians of Australia, Seventh Edition. Clayton, Victoria, Australia: CSIRO Publishing. xxx + 1,033 pp. .
Dolman G, Hugall AF (2008). "Combined mitochondrial and nuclear data enhance resolution of a rapid radiation of Australian rainbow skinks (Scincidae: Carlia)". Molecular Phylogenetics and Evolution 49 (3): 782–794. (Lygisaurus tanneri).
Ingram G, Covacevich J (1988). "Revision of the genus Lygisaurus De Vis (Scincidae: Reptilia) in Australia". Memoirs of the Queensland Museum 25 (2): 335–354. (Lygisaurus tanneri, new species).
Stuart-Fox DM, Hugall AF, Moritz C (2002). "A molecular phylogeny of rainbow skinks (Scincidae: Carlia): taxonomic and biogeographic implications". Australian Journal of Zoology 50 (1): 39–51. (Carlia tanneri, new combination).
Wilson S, Swan G (2013). A Complete Guide to Reptiles of Australia, Fourth Edition. Sydney: New Holland Publishers. 522 pp. .

Lygisaurus
Reptiles described in 1988
Skinks of Australia
Endemic fauna of Australia
Taxa named by Glen Joseph Ingram
Taxa named by Jeanette Covacevich